Augustine Jebaraj was an Anglican bishop in the Church of South India: he was the Bishop of Tirunelveli from 1953 to 1970.

References

Anglican bishops of Tinnevelly
20th-century Anglican bishops in India
Indian bishops
Indian Christian religious leaders